Hum pri Ormožu is a settlement in the Municipality of Ormož in northeastern Slovenia. The area traditionally belonged to the Styria region and is now included in the Drava Statistical Region.

The local church is dedicated to John the Baptist and belongs to the Parish of Ormož. It was built in 1611 and has a rectangular barrel vaulted nave with a three sided sanctuary and a belfry on its western facade.

References

External links
Hum pri Ormožu on Geopedia

Populated places in the Municipality of Ormož